Erkki Rajala (12 March 1923 – 5 December 1977) was a Finnish ski jumper. He competed in the individual event at the 1948 Winter Olympics.

References

External links
 

1923 births
1977 deaths
Finnish male ski jumpers
Olympic ski jumpers of Finland
Ski jumpers at the 1948 Winter Olympics
People from Orimattila
Sportspeople from Päijät-Häme
20th-century Finnish people